Miss China World is a national pageant that sends representatives to Miss World Pageant. It is the first and oldest national beauty contest to be established in China.

History 
Miss China is the biggest national beauty pageant in Mainland China. It sends China representatives to Miss World Beauty Pageant since 2001.

Titleholders 
Color key

See also
Miss Universe China
Miss International China
Miss Earth China

References

External links
 Official Miss World China website

China
China
2001 establishments in China
Chinese awards